Nothostele is a genus of flowering plants from the orchid family, Orchidaceae. It contains two known species, both endemic to Brazil.

Nothostele acianthiformis (Rchb.f. & Warm.) Garay - Minas Gerais
Nothostele brasiliaensis J.A.N.Bat., Meneguzzo & Bianch - Distrito Federal and Goiás

See also 
 List of Orchidaceae genera

References 

 Batista, J.A.N., Meneguzzo, T.E.C., Salazar, G.A., Ramalho, A.J. & Bianchetti, L.B. 2011. Phylogenetic placement, taxonomic revision and a new species of Nothostele (Orchidaceae), an enigmatic genus endemic to the cerrado of central Brazil. Botanical Journal of the Linnean Society, 165(4): 348–363. 
  (1982) Botanical Museum Leaflets 28(4): 339.
  (2003) Genera Orchidacearum 3: 1–358. Oxford University Press.
  2005. Handbuch der Orchideen-Namen. Dictionary of Orchid Names. Dizionario dei nomi delle orchidee. Ulmer, Stuttgart
  (2011) Phylogenetic placement, taxonomic revision and a new species of Nothostele (Orchidaceae), an enigmatic genus endemic to the cerrado of central Brazil, Botanical Journal of the Linnean Society, 165(4): 348–363.

External links 

Cranichideae genera
Spiranthinae
Orchids of Brazil